LCER may refer to:
Labour Campaign for Electoral Reform
Lewis Center for Educational Research, an educational organization in Apple Valley, California